Sarkar Dada or Sarkkar Dada is a 2005 Indian Malayalam action film,  directed by Sasi Shanker and produced by Kalliyoor Sasi. The film stars Jayaram, Navya Nair, Salim Kumar and Kalasala Babu in lead roles. The film had musical score by M. Jayachandran. This movie was a disaster in box office and got very negative reviews from critics. But later on, when the film was telecasted in the television, it got a positive response from the audience as well as critics and turned out to be a satellite hit.

Cast
Jayaram as Srimangalatthu Mukundan Menon (Sarkar Dada) and Srimangalatthu Gopinatha Menon
Navya Nair as RDO Sandhya
Salim Kumar as Kumaran
Harishree Ashokan as Urumees
Cochin Haneefa as SI Sundareshan
Jagadish as Velayudhan
Kalasala Babu as Adv. Damodaran Nambiar
Baiju as Murali
Riyaz Khan as Abbas
Nivia Rebin

References

External links
 
 

2005 films
2000s Malayalam-language films
Films directed by Sasi Shanker